Mac Tonnies (20 August 1975 – 22 October 2009) was an American author and blogger whose work focused on futurology, transhumanism and paranormal topics.

Background
Tonnies grew up in Independence, Missouri, and attended William Chrisman High School and Ottawa University.   He lived in Kansas City, Missouri.  Tonnies had an active online presence and a "small, but devoted" readership, but supported himself by working at Starbucks and other nine-to-five jobs. In 2009 he died of cardiac arrhythmia at the age of 34.

Books 
His first book, a collection of science fiction short stories titled Illumined Black, was published by Phantom Press Publications in 1995, when Tonnies was in college.  It carried a cover blurb by Bruce Sterling and was positively reviewed in Booklist. His second book, After the Martian Apocalypse, was published by Simon & Schuster in 2004.  His third book, The Cryptoterrestrials, was published posthumously by Anomalist Books in 2010.

In November, 2012, Redstar Books published the first volume of Posthuman Blues, which contains excerpts from Tonnies' long-running blog of the same name. In the introduction, historian Aaron John Gulyas writes that, "Posthuman Blues is of a piece with the Lost Generation of the 1920s and the Beat Generation of the 1950s. Tonnies spoke for his generation with passion, eloquence, and a rare insight."

Other media 
In 2007 the play Doing Time, which he co-wrote with Canadian filmmaker Paul Kimball (who was working on a documentary about Tonnies), premiered in Halifax, Nova Scotia. He also appeared in the documentary Best Evidence: Top 10 UFO Sightings, and an episode of the Canadian television series Supernatural Investigator.

His blog, "Posthuman blues" was described by The Pitch as "one of Kansas City's best blogs, filled with well-written, intelligent takes on offbeat news items and humorous rants from a left-leaning political perspective."

He appeared on Coast to Coast AM in September 2009, and was a frequent guest on The Paracast.

Cryptoterrestrial hypothesis 
The cryptoterrestrial hypothesis was developed in Tonnies's blog, and later published posthumously. It proposes that extraterrestrial beings are actually mysterious and secretive races of earthly origin. These races have existed upon Earth for at least as long as humanity, and present themselves as extraterrestrials or occult beings.
Some have suggested that this is an extension of the ideas of Richard Shaver.

See also 
 Conspiracy theory
 Extraterrestrial hypothesis
 John Keel
 Jacques Vallée

Notes

External links

Posthuman Blues. Tonnies' blog
Redstar Books
Posthuman Blues
Aaron John Gulyas
Paul Kimball

1975 births
2009 deaths
Writers from Independence, Missouri
Ottawa University alumni
American bloggers
American science fiction writers
Novelists from Missouri
American male novelists
American male short story writers
20th-century American novelists
20th-century American short story writers
20th-century American male writers
American male bloggers